D'Urville Sea is a sea of the Southern Ocean, north of the coast of Adélie Land, East Antarctica. It is named after the French explorer and officer Jules Dumont d'Urville.

References

Seas of the Southern Ocean
Adélie Land
Antarctic region